Ihor Zelenyuk is a Ukrainian retired footballer.

Career
He started playing in the Ukrainian championship in 1993 in the first league team Krystal Chortkiv. In his first match (against Desna Chernihiv), Zelenyuk scored his first and last goal in the Ukrainian championships.

The following year, Igor moved to Ternopil's Niva, where he played two matches in the top league of the Ukrainian championship. The first match: July 17, 1994 Nyva Ternopil - "Temp" (0: 0). Unable to establish himself in the team from the "tower", Zelenyuk returned to the Ukrainian First League in Bukovyna Chernivtsi, and then - back in the Krystal Chortkiv.

In 1996, Zelenyuk played for the second time in the major league, which he left in the same season with the team Nyva Ternopil. The third arrival in "tower" for Igor passed according to the scenario of the second, - his Mykolaiv also following the results of a season lost a place in the top division.

In 2001, the footballer played in the championship of Kazakhstan for Tobol, with which he took sixth place.

References

External links 
 Ihor Zelenyuk footballfacts.ru
 Ihor Zelenyuk allplayers.in.ua

1972 births
Living people
FC Desna Chernihiv players
FC Nyva Ternopil players
FC Bukovyna Chernivtsi players
FC Krystal Chortkiv players
FC Ros Bila Tserkva players
FC Mykolaiv players
FC Enerhiya Yuzhnoukrainsk players
FC Tobol players
Ukrainian footballers
Ukrainian Premier League players
Ukrainian First League players
Ukrainian Second League players
Ukrainian expatriate sportspeople in Kazakhstan
Expatriate footballers in Kazakhstan
Association football defenders